Fayette Springs Hotel, also known as Stone House Restaurant, is a historic inn and tavern located at Wharton Township, Fayette County, Pennsylvania.  It was built about 1822, and is a -story, 5-bay, brick building with a center hall floor plan with Federal-style detailing. It has a -story, kitchen ell. It was built by Congressman Andrew Stewart (1791-1872).  It served as a stop for 19th-century travelers on the National Road.

It was added to the National Register of Historic Places in 1995.

External links
Stone House Inn official site

References

Hotel buildings on the National Register of Historic Places in Pennsylvania
Federal architecture in Pennsylvania
Hotel buildings completed in 1822
Buildings and structures in Fayette County, Pennsylvania
National Register of Historic Places in Fayette County, Pennsylvania
1822 establishments in Pennsylvania